West Dinajpur district was a district of the state of West Bengal from 1947 to 1992. At India's independence, the former Dinajpur district of undivided Bengal was partitioned along religious lines, and West Dinajpur became one of the 14 districts of West Bengal. The other part of the district continues as Dinajpur district of Bangladesh.

With the States Reorganisation Act of 1956, some Bengali-speaking areas from Bihar were added to this district. On 1 April 1992, the West Dinajpur district was divided into Uttar Dinajpur district (north) and Dakshin Dinajpur district (south).

References

Former districts of West Bengal
1947 establishments in West Bengal